Edward Hamilton may refer to:

Sir Edward Hamilton, 1st Baronet (1772–1851), Royal Navy admiral
Edward D. Hamilton (1801–1883), secretary of the Oregon Territory, 1850–1853
Edward Hamilton (pastoralist) (1809–1898), British pastoralist in New South Wales and Member of Parliament for Salisbury
Edward Hamilton (homeopath) (1815–1903), British homeopath
Edward Hamilton (Australian politician) (1831–?), Colonial Architect and member of the House of Assembly in South Australia
Sir Edward Walter Hamilton (1847–1908), British political diarist and private secretary to William Ewart Gladstone
Edward Hamilton (British Army officer) (1854–1944), British Army officer
Edward L. Hamilton (1857–1923), U.S. Representative from Michigan
Ed Hamilton (American football) (1880–?), college football, basketball, and baseball player and coach
Edward S. Hamilton (1917–2006), American World War II veteran and CIA operative
Ed Hamilton (born 1947), American sculptor